5 Star is a 2002 Indian Tamil-language coming-of-age film directed by Susi Ganeshan and starring Prasanna (in his acting debut), Kanika, Krishna, Sandhya, Mangai, and Karthik.

Plot
The story focuses on five friends, Prabhu, Elango, Sundar, Indra and Priya at the Madras Institute of Technology, who want to remain friends throughout their lifespan and hope to join the same company after graduation. During a vacation Elango, goes home where he is forced to marry his old-fashioned cousin, Eshwari, by his tough disciplinarian father. Once back to college he hides the fact about his marriage to his friends but later the marriage becomes public when relatives of Eshwari come to visit Elango. While their dream to work together becomes true, Elango alone gets a transfer to Bombay. The friends fight but later reunite. Before Elango goes Bombay the friends force him to visit his wife and put him on a train. But Elango manages to get off the train and from there loses touch with his friends and family in the village.

The friends part and six years later Prabu and Sundar come back to join Priya and Indra in Chennai. On the train journey back, Prabu meets Elango's wife Eshwari. Prabu falls in love with Eshwari without realizing who she is. Eventually he along with his friends finds out the truth about Eshwari, who is waiting with hopes of her husband to return. The four friends decided to help Eshwari find the whereabouts of Elango. One day Prabu finds out that Elango might be in Switzerland. Prabu decides to go to Switzerland. One fine day he finds Elango but to his shocks Elango has a kid and is married to a Swiss woman. 
By the same time, in India Elango's father commits suicide. Prabu return back to India and learn that everyone knows about Elango's marriage.

Eshwari decides to marry again and move on with life rather than thinking about Elango. Her village people decides to marry her off to one of her relative but she threatens them telling them off that she would decide her own life and no one is going control her life anymore. The story ends with all four friends and their husbands and wife along with Eshwari enjoying an evening at the beach.

Cast 
 Prasanna as Prabhu
 Kanika as Eshwari
 Krishna as Elango 
 Sandhya Prakash as Priya
 Mangai as Indra
 Karthick as Sundar
 Vijayan as Elango's father
 Chitti Babu as Train Ticket Examiner (TTR)
 Srilekha Rajendran as Flower seller
Sai ( junior)
Dr. P. Mannar Jawahar as Professor

Production
In March 1999, Susi Ganeshan was able to convince producer Shanti Thiagarajan to fund his first feature film, after he left Mani Ratnam's team of assistant directors. The film was initially titled Thithikkum Thee and was to feature to Murali in the lead role of a firefighter. In return for producing his first film, Shanti Thiagarajan requested Ganeshan to also work on another film starring her son Prashanth in the lead role and consequently, Ganeshan finalised a script titled Pepsi: Generation Next. In a turn of events, Prashanth replaced Murali in the director's first project, which was retitled as Virumbugiren in early 2000. Pepsi was later supposed to star Madhavan in a lead role, but he eventually did not feature as the team opted for newcomers. Susi Ganeshan, an erstwhile assistant director of Mani Ratnam announced this film in 2001 and finished in between production delays of his long-delayed film Virumbugiren.

For the heroine, Susi Ganeshan spotted her on a magazine cover page and insisted on her performing the lead female role in his second feature film. Divya eventually entered the Film industry, accepting the offer, while her name was changed to Kanika. She completed the entire film during her summer holidays, since she was a student. Prasanna who was doing college at that time saw an ad on Vijay TV that Madras Talkies was auditioning for newcomers, he applied and got selected. For other lead roles, Karthik, the son of a Tirupur businessman, Krishna, an earlier assistant to director Rajiv Menon, Sandhya, a model and also a former Ms. Chennai, and Mangaikarasi, a dancer based in Sweden. the film marked the debut of cameraman Ravi Varman in Tamil cinema. Singer Anuradha Sriram and her husband Sriram Parasuram made their debut as music directors with this film.

The film had a 10-day shooting schedule at the M.I.T. College where Susi Ganesan had studied, followed by a 15-day schedule in Switzerland where some scenes and two songs were shot.

Soundtrack
Music was composed by Sriram Parasuram and Anuradha Sriram.

Reception
Chennai Online wrote "Some young promising talent, a story centered round youth and their aspirations, the fulfillment of some, the disillusionment of others, stylised takings and a sincere attempt to give an entertainer sans vulgarity and double entendres, makes 'Five Star' a clean, fairly engaging family entertainer." The Hindu wrote "Susi Ganesan's youthful, hard-hitting dialogue and a fairly neat screenplay are notable aspects of the film — the story and direction, also by him are done with a difference".

References

2002 films
2000s Tamil-language films
Films set in universities and colleges
Indian coming-of-age films
Indian buddy films
2002 directorial debut films
Films directed by Susi Ganeshan